Leslie David Reed  (24 July 1935 – 15 April 2019) was an English songwriter, arranger, musician and light-orchestra leader. His major songwriting partners were Gordon Mills, Barry Mason, and Geoff Stephens, although he wrote songs with many others such as Roger Greenaway, Roger Cook, Peter Callander, and Johnny Worth.

Reed co-wrote around sixty charting songs, and is best known for "It's Not Unusual", "Delilah", "The Last Waltz" and "Marching On Together". His songs gained a number of gold discs and Ivor Novello Awards. Allmusic noted that "In the mid-1960s, it was unusual for a British singles chart not to list a Les Reed song". He won the British Academy Gold Badge of Merit in 1982.

Early life
Reed was born in Woking, Surrey, and grew up there. He was an accomplished musician by the age of 14, playing the piano, accordion and vibraphone. He studied at the London College of Music before joining the Willis Reed Group, with whom he toured for four years. Having been called up for National Service, he played piano and clarinet in the Royal East Kent Military Band. In 1959, he joined The John Barry Seven as their pianist.

Songwriting career
In the mid-1960s, Reed began a successful songwriting partnership with Geoff Stephens which yielded such hits as "Tell Me When", a hit for The Applejacks; "Here It Comes Again" for The Fortunes; "Leave A Little Love" for Lulu; and "There's a Kind of Hush", a 1967 success for Herman's Hermits. During 1964, Reed penned "It's Not Unusual" with ex-Viscounts member and Tom Jones' manager Gordon Mills, which was Jones' debut recording and gave him a UK number 1. Reed also arranged the song and played the piano for the recording.

Around this time, Reed struck up a songwriting partnership with Barry Mason. They wrote a song for Kathy Kirby, "I'll Try Not To Cry", as Britain's entry in 1965 for the Eurovision Song Contest held in Naples. The song was beaten by "I Belong". The songwriters had a 1967 hit in "Everybody Knows" by The Dave Clark Five—who also recorded a Reed–Mason follow-up—and another success in 1968 with "Delilah", again a Top 10 hit for Tom Jones. "Delilah" was originally written for P. J. Proby, and later covered by The Sensational Alex Harvey Band in 1975. Reed and Mason also wrote "The Last Waltz", which became a million selling UK number one for Engelbert Humperdinck in September 1967.

Mason and Reed wrote "Who's Doctor Who?", a novelty song recorded by Doctor Who star Frazer Hines in 1967, but it failed to chart. In 1968, the duo scored another UK number 1 hit with Des O'Connor's recording of "I Pretend". That same year, "I've Got My Eyes on You", written by Reed and Jackie Rae, was recorded by Petula Clark, Ray Conniff, P. J. Proby and The Vogues. Following Petula Clark's original version, Connie Francis recorded "Kiss Me Goodbye" on her album Connie Francis Sings the Songs of Les Reed, which featured Reed as producer and pianist; the album was released in November 1969.

In 1970, Reed's orchestra recorded "Man of Action" which was used as the theme tune for Radio North Sea International until 1974. In 1971, "When There's No You" by Reed and Jackie Rae was recorded by Englebert Humperdinck and became Humperdinck's second of four number ones on the US easy-listening chart, reaching number one in April 1971. In 1972, he co-wrote Leeds United F.C.'s anthem "Marching On Together".

At the 1973 Tokyo Music Festival, Reed and Stephens won the Silver Star for "Sandy Sandy", whilst in 1977 Reed and Tony Macaulay triumphed at the International Song Contest in Majorca with "You and I". Reed and Roger Greenaway were awarded the Grand Prix Award in Seoul for "Everytime You Go". Reed's songs have been recorded by Elvis Presley ("Girl of Mine", "Sylvia" and "This Is Our Dance"), Shirley Bassey ("Does Anybody Miss Me") and Bing Crosby ("That's What Life Is All About"). Reed's film score composition credits include those for The Girl on a Motorcycle (1968), The Bushbaby (1969), One More Time (1970), George and Mildred (1980), Creepshow 2 (1987) and Parting Shots (1999).

Reed composed music for stage-musical productions including The Magic Show (1974), American Heroes and And Then I Wrote. In 1994, Reed produced an album for Max Bygraves to raise money for the Lest We Forget Association. Reed co-composed, with Roger Cook, the score for the 2004 musical Beautiful and Damned, based on the lives of Zelda and F. Scott Fitzgerald.

Awards and honours
His songs gained a number of gold discs and Ivor Novello Awards. Reed won the British Academy Gold Badge of Merit in 1982. He was honoured as a Freeman of the City of London for his contributions to the music industry. In 1998, Reed was given an Order of the British Empire.

Chart hits and other notable songs written by Reed

Recordings 
Reed also conducted his own band, The Les Reed Orchestra, and was billed under various names. His orchestra's recordings included:
 1962 - "Dr. Finlay's Casebook (March From "A Little Suite")" – The Les Reed Strings (September 1962, Piccadilly Records, 7N.35080)
 1963 - "Minuet Mash/Nightfall" – The Les Reed Piano (January 1963, (Piccadilly Records, 7N.35097)
 1963 - "On the Scene/High Society" – The Les Reed Piano (May 1963, (Piccadilly Records, 7N.35122)
 1964 - "Spanish Armada/Madrid" – The Les Reed Combo (March 1964, (Fontana Records, TF455)
 1964 - "Little Leprechaun/Come Take My Hand" – Les Reed Orchestra (November 1964, (Fontana Records, H496)
 1965 - "Poor Little Rich Girl/High Bright Sun" – Les Reed Orchestra (February 1965, (Fontana Records, TF545)
 1965 - "Hot Line/Ten Feet Tall" – Les Reed Orchestra (May 1965, Fontana, TF576)
 1966 - "Good Kings Went Ridiculous/Valley Of The Kings" – Les Reed Orchestra (November 1966, (Fontana Records, TF765)
 1967 - "Imogene/The Pay Off 28" – Les Reed Orchestra (Deram Records, DMA-1013)
 1967 - "Copacabana Girl/Imogene" (Deram Records, 85010)
 1967 - "Fly Me To The Sun" (Deram Records, SML 1008)
 1967 - "New Dimensions" (Deram Records, DML 709) as The Les Reed Sound
 1968 - "Theme From 'Candice'/The Last Waltz" – Les Reed Orchestra (DMA-1019)
 1969 - "Love Is All" (London Records, SP 44136), with The Eddie Lester Singers
 1969 - "Big Drum/Don't Linger With Your Finger on the Trigger" (Deram Records, 7525)
 1970 - "Man of Action/Madrid" Chapter 1, CH 126
 1971 - "The hit making world of Les Reed" (Decca Records, SPA 386)
 1973 - "Man of Action" (Decca Records, 6835 122)
 1974 - "Slaughter on Tenth Avenue/The Hawk" – Les Reed Orchestra (Bell Records, BELL1342)

Personal life
He was married to June, who predeceased him; the couple had a daughter.

References

External links

John Barry Website (with complete Drumbeat listings)
"In the Spotlight with Les Reed" an internet radio program devoted Reed's music
 

1935 births
2019 deaths
English songwriters
English pianists
British music arrangers
People from Woking
Officers of the Order of the British Empire
Deram Records artists
21st-century pianists
English conductors (music)